Werner-Boyce Salt Springs State Park is a Florida state park located in Pasco County, Florida near Port Richey, Florida, along the Gulf of Mexico on the Atlantic coastal plain. An entrance to this park is at the intersection of Scenic Drive and Cinema Drive, one mile west of the intersection of Cinema Drive/Ridge Manor Blvd. and U.S. Highway 19. The park is named, in part, for a 320 feet deep saltwater spring in the park, which is not yet easily accessible. The park includes four miles of Pasco County's coastal waters on the Gulf of Mexico.
 
Activities include picnicking, boating, fishing, hiking, and wildlife viewing. The park's wildlife include gray foxes, gopher tortoises, alligators, and West Indian manatees, as well as about 150 species of bird. Among the park's birds are raptors, wading birds, shore birds, and migratory song birds.

The park includes a half mile nature trail, a picnic pavilion, and informational kiosk. Visitors can explore the park's waterways by boat, but there is no boat ramp as yet. The park is new, and planned additions include hiking trails, primitive camping, group camping, picnicking and marked canoe/kayak trails.  The park was named by Robert Pullen and CJ Bennett in a contest when the two were classmates at Hudson Elementary School.

The park is open from 8:00 am till sundown year round.

References and external links
 Werner-Boyce Salt Springs State Park at Florida State Parks
 Salt Springs Alliance - Citizen Support Organization for Werner-Boyce Salt Springs State Park
 Werner-Boyce Salt Springs State Park at Wildernet
 Werner-Boyce Salt Springs State Park masterplanning and spring restoration information

Parks in Pasco County, Florida
State parks of Florida